Kusumoto (written: 楠本) is a Japanese surname. Notable people with the surname include:

, Japanese physician
Roy Kusumoto, American businessman
, Japanese footballer

Japanese-language surnames